Back in the Game may refer to:

 Back in the Game (2013 TV series), a 2013 American comedy television series that aired on ABC
 Back in the Game (2019 TV series), a 2019 American entrepreneurial television series broadcast on CNBC
 "Back in the Game" (The Suite Life of Zack and Cody episode)
 Back in the Game (Chad Brownlee album), 2019
 Back in the Game (Syl Johnson album), 1994

See also
The Back in the Game Tour